Glenn Bosch is an American politician. He is a Republican representing District 30 in the North Dakota House of Representatives.

Political career 

Bosch was first elected to represent District 30 in the North Dakota House of Representatives in 2016, and is running for re-election in 2020.

Bosch sits on the following committees:
 Energy and Natural Resources
 Industry, Business and Labor
 Information Technology Interim Committee
 Statewide Interoperability Executive Committee

Personal life 

Bosch is a lifelong resident of Bismarck, North Dakota. He holds an AS from Bismarck State College, and worked for Bismarck-based AVI Systems for over 30 years. He is also a co-owner of the Bismarck Larks baseball club.

References 

Living people
Republican Party members of the North Dakota House of Representatives
Politicians from Bismarck, North Dakota
Bismarck State College alumni
Year of birth missing (living people)
21st-century American politicians